Sweetwater Mansion (also known as the Governor Robert Patton House), located in Florence, Alabama, is a plantation house designed by General John Brahan of the Alabama Militia.

History
A veteran of the War of 1812, John Brahan owned more than 4,000 acres in eastern Lauderdale County, Alabama. The eight room home was built of bricks manufactured on the site of Sweetwater Creek which lay just below the house. Sweetwater Mansion received its name from the creek and was first occupied by Brahan's son-in-law Robert M. Patton, a post-Civil War governor of Alabama, who completed the mansion in 1835.

The house was listed on the National Register of Historic Places in 1976.

Legends and ghost stories
Stories of paranormal activity have been told about the house for many years. Numerous apparitions have allegedly been seen in and around the house. One of the most interesting stories involves a caretaker who reported that she saw a casket laid out in one of the downstairs rooms with the corpse of a Confederate soldier inside. She later discovered she had possibly seen the body of one of Governor Patton's sons, Billy Patton, whose funeral was conducted in the house after he was killed in the Civil War.

Local paranormal investigators have investigated the property and Sweetwater Mansion was featured in an episode of A&E's Paranormal State on April 25, 2011. Billy was mourned by his mother Jane Patton who was so distraught and depressed after her loss, that she didn't want to bury her son's body and kept his decomposing corpse in a secret room in the basement. Paranormal investigators believe Jane's sorrowful spirit still haunts the house.

Sweetwater Mansion was also featured as a haunted location on the paranormal TV series Most Terrifying Places which aired on the Travel Channel in 2019.

References

External links

  

National Register of Historic Places in Lauderdale County, Alabama
Houses completed in 1835
Houses in Lauderdale County, Alabama
Reportedly haunted locations in Alabama
Historic American Buildings Survey in Alabama